Jovan Đurov Ivanišević (1861-1889) was a Montenegrin composer from Donji Kraj near Cetinje, Montenegro. While young he showed exquisite talent for music, and is most famous for composing the contemporary anthem of Principality of Montenegro and Kingdom of Montenegro, Ubavoj nam Crnoj Gori (To Our Beautiful Montenegro). He died while being a student of the Prague Conservatory: while ice skating on the Vltava, the ice broke under him and he drowned.

References
  Glas Crnogorca, 19 October 1999: Jovan Markuš: Двије црногорске химне

Montenegrin composers
1889 deaths
Accidental deaths in the Czech Republic
Deaths by drowning
1861 births
19th-century composers
National anthem writers